Rufous-backed sparrow is a mostly obsolete name for several different birds:
 Iago sparrow
 Sind sparrow

See also
 Rufous sparrow (disambiguation)

Birds by common name